The 2015 Davidson Wildcats football team represented Davidson College in the 2015 NCAA Division I FCS football season. They were led by third-year head coach Paul Nichols and played their home games at Richardson Stadium. They were a member of the Pioneer Football League. They finished the season 2–9, 1–7 in PFL play to finish in a three-way tie for eighth place.

Schedule

Source: Schedule

Game summaries

at The Citadel

Catawba

at Morehead State

Valparaiso

Kentucky Wesleyan

at Butler

Marist

Campbell

at Jacksonville

San Diego

at Stetson

References

Davidson
Davidson Wildcats football seasons
Davidson Wildcats football